The 2019 FIA Motorsport Games was the first edition of the FIA Motorsport Games held at ACI Vallelunga Circuit, Campagnano di Roma from 1 November to 3 November 2019. The games were won by Russia.

Summary
It featured GT3-spec cars, TCR Touring Car, Formula 4, drifting, a karting slalom and eSports disciplines. Only Silver and Bronze drivers were allowed to compete. The event promoters were the Federation Internationale de l'Automobile (FIA) and the Stéphane Ratel Organisation (SRO). Rome was the city that hosted the opening ceremony on 30 October 2019.

The event was contested in the Olympics-style, but because machine-based or motorized sports are not recognised by the Olympic Games organisation they will not be recognised as an Olympic event. "Motorized" events were held at the 1900 Summer Olympics and 1908 Summer Olympics (see Motor racing at the 1900 Summer Olympics and Water motorsports at the 1908 Summer Olympics) but they are not now regarded as official Olympic events. 

166 athletes from 49 National FIA member organisations took part. 18 sets of medals were featured in the 6 disciplines.

Team Russia topped the medal table, with one gold medal for Touring Car Cup and three medals (bronze medals in Karting Slalom and Drifting) overall. Team Australia and Team Italy tied on the second place with equal amount of gold (for Digital and Formula 4 Cups respectively) and bronze medals (for GT and Digital Cups respectively). Team Belgium (Touring Car and Karting Slalom Cups) was the only other team to win more than one medal. 13 different national teams received at least one medal.

Schedule
A provisional schedule was revealed on 30 August 2019.

Participants

Teams
Team France, Team Italy, Team Kuwait and Team Russia are the only teams with confirmed line-up in all six cups.

Athletes

Medal table

References

External links

 
2019
FIA Motorsport Games
FIA Motorsport Games
FIA Motorsport Games
FIA Motorsport Games